is a Japanese long-distance runner. In 2019, he competed in the senior men's race at the 2019 IAAF World Cross Country Championships held in Aarhus, Denmark. He finished in 78th place.

In 2018, he finished in 17th place in the men's 5000 metres event at the 2018 IAAF World U20 Championships held in Tampere, Finland.

References

External links 
 

Living people
1999 births
Place of birth missing (living people)
Japanese male long-distance runners
Japanese male cross country runners